BM is the fifth studio album by Berlin-based musician Barbara Morgenstern. "Driving My Car" is sung in German, English and Polish, while it is the first Barbara Morgenstern album to include full English translation of all her lyrics in the sleeve notes. The album also features a collaboration with former Soft Machine drummer Robert Wyatt. One EP, Come To Berlin Mixes, was taken from the album - the song's lyrics are critical of city planning politics in Berlin.

Track listing

Personnel 

Barbara Morgenstern - piano, vocals, electronics
Julia Kent - Cello
Chor Der Kulturen Der Welt - Choir
Arne Ghosh - Drums
Sven Janetzko - Guitar
Robert Wyatt - Vocals (track 6)

References 

2008 albums
Barbara Morgenstern albums